William Doane may refer to:
 William Croswell Doane, American Episcopal bishop
 William Howard Doane, inventor, hymn writer, church leader and philanthropist

See also
William Duane (disambiguation)